Slieve Beagh is a mountainous area straddling the border between County Monaghan in the Republic of Ireland and County Fermanagh and County Tyrone in Northern Ireland. A point just east of its summit is the highest point in Monaghan; however the true summit is on the Fermanagh-Tyrone border. The point where the three counties meet, is referred to as the "Three County Hollow".

Name
The original Irish name for the area is Sliabh Beatha, which has been anglicised to Slieve Beagh, but sometimes the two languages are combined to form Sliabh Beagh. According to Irish mythology, the name refers to the mythological figure Bith, who was buried in a cairn on top of the mountain. Although the summit is in fact marked by a cairn, called Doocarn, it is likely that the name's original meaning is "mountain of birch". In County Monaghan, the locals typically refer to the Slieve Beagh as the "Bragan Mountains", taking the name from a townland within the Slieve Beagh.

Geography
Slieve Beagh has many low, smooth summits. The area is mainly blanket bog, with many small lakes and streams throughout. In Northern Ireland, much of Slieve Beagh has been designated as a Special Area of Conservation. The Finn River rises on the slopes of Slieve Beagh.

Ramsar site
The Slieve Beagh Ramsar site (wetlands of international importance designated under the Ramsar Convention), is 1884.68 hectares in area, at latitude 54 20 53 N and longitude 07 11 38 W. It was designated a Ramsar site on 14 December 1999. The Ramsar site boundary coincides entirely with that of the Slieve Beagh Area of Special Scientific Interest and the Slieve Beagh Special Area of Conservation.

Vegetation is characterized by sphagnum mosses and ericoid dwarf-shrubs.

See also 
Cuilcagh
Lists of mountains in Ireland
List of Irish counties by highest point
List of mountains of the British Isles by height
List of Marilyns in the British Isles

References

External links
 Slieve Beagh Hotel and Tourism Centre
 Slieve Beagh way

Mountains and hills of County Fermanagh
Mountains and hills of County Tyrone
Mountains and hills of County Monaghan
Special Areas of Conservation in Ireland
Ramsar sites in Northern Ireland
Highest points of Irish counties